Vinzenz Höck (born 6 March 1996), often written as Vinzenz Hoeck, is an Austrian artistic gymnast.

In 2017, he competed in the men's artistic team all-around event at the Summer Universiade held in Taipei, Taiwan. In 2019, he won the silver medal in the rings event at the Summer Universiade held in Naples, Italy.

He won the silver medal in the rings event at the 2020 European Men's Artistic Gymnastics Championships held in Mersin, Turkey.

References

External links 
 

Living people
1996 births
Sportspeople from Salzburg
Austrian male artistic gymnasts
Universiade medalists in gymnastics
Universiade silver medalists for Austria
Competitors at the 2017 Summer Universiade
Medalists at the 2019 Summer Universiade
21st-century Austrian people